Staplehurst railway station is on the South Eastern Main Line in England, serving the village of Staplehurst, Kent. It is  down the line from London Charing Cross . The station and all trains that serve the station are operated by Southeastern.

The station opened in August 1842. It is well known for the Staplehurst rail crash on 9 June 1865 on which Charles Dickens was a passenger.

History
The platforms were widened in 1889. A footbridge over the platforms was installed in 1961, in preparation for the electrification of the South Eastern Main Line.

A coal depot was established at Staplehurst in September 1965. All goods facilities were withdrawn on 4 October 1971.

Facilities
Staplehurst is located in the north of the urban area on the A229 road which runs from Chatham to Hastings via Maidstone. The ticket office is located on the London-bound platform 1. A passenger-operated self-service ticket machine is located next to the station.

The station is used by commuters to London from Cranbrook, Sissinghurst and Hawkhurst, which have no stations of their own. Arriva Southern Counties bus 5 links these three settlements to the station.

Services
All services at Staplehurst are operated by Southeastern using  EMUs.

The typical off-peak service in trains per hour is:

 2 tph to London Charing Cross
 1 tph to 
 1 tph to  via 

During the peak hours, there are additional services to and from London Cannon Street and the service to Dover Priory is extended to and from Ramsgate via .

Incidents
The stretch of line near the station which crosses the River Beult was the site of a fatal train accident on 9 June 1865, which killed ten people and injured forty. This accident is well known in literary circles as Charles Dickens was on the stricken train and survived. The accident left Dickens very anxious about rail travel.

On 21 January 1960, the up platform buildings were destroyed by fire. They were replaced by a modern construction.

On 14 September 1996, a train derailed at the station. The cause of the accident was excess speed.

References
Citations

Sources

External links

Signal box diagrams for 1950 and 1962
Staplehurst station on navigable 1940 OS map

Borough of Maidstone
Railway stations in Kent
DfT Category C2 stations
Former South Eastern Railway (UK) stations
Railway stations in Great Britain opened in 1842
Railway stations served by Southeastern